Nicholas Westaway (born 20 January 1989) is an Australian actor and singer. From 2012 until 2016, he starred as Kyle Braxton in the soap opera Home and Away.

Early life
Westaway was raised in Margaret River. He has two brothers. Westaway attended Margaret River Senior High School, the Outloud Dance Academy and performed with the Margaret River Theatre Group. He also played football for the Margaret River Hawks. Westaway deferred a sports science degree at the University of Western Australia, and later moved to Perth to attend the Western Australian Academy of Performing Arts (WAAPA).

Career
Westaway has appeared in three short films: Running: A Western Australia Short, Happy Haven and Bonsai. In 2012, Westaway relocated to Sydney after successfully auditioning for the role of Kyle Braxton in Home and Away. He also appeared in the feature length spin-off Home and Away: An Eye for an Eye in 2015. Westaway decided to leave the show after almost four years, and he made his final appearance on 21 April 2016. He later reprised the role for two further specials: Home and Away: Revenge and Home and Away: All or Nothing.

Westaway stars as Samantha Jade's love interest in the music video for her single "Always". In 2017, Westaway joined the cast of science fiction film, Neurogenesis, along with his former Home and Away co-stars Marlo Kelly and Darcey Wilson. He also appears as American musician Xavier in Dance Academy: The Movie, and has filmed an appearance in television series We Were Tomorrow.

Westaway launched into his theatre career when taking up the main role of Prince Aladdin in the 2019 Christmas pantomime ‘Aladdin’ by Enchanted Entertainment at the Tyne Theatre & Opera House in Newcastle Upon Tyne, UK.

Filmography

References

External links

 
 Nic Westaway at Yahoo!7

1989 births
Living people
People from Margaret River, Western Australia
Australian male soap opera actors
Male actors from Western Australia
21st-century Australian male actors
Australian male film actors